World Cup Golf: Professional Edition is a video game released in 1994.

Reviews
Electronic Gaming Monthly gave the 3DO version a 7/10.

IGN gave the PlayStation version a 5/10

Next Generation reviewed the Saturn version of the game, rating it three stars out of five, and stated that "The only real drawback to the game is that there is only one course available for play. It seems almost a shame to create such enjoyable gameplay and then only offer one course on which to enjoy it."

References

1994 video games
1996 video games
3DO Interactive Multiplayer games
Arc Developments games
CD-i games
DOS games
PlayStation (console) games
Sega Saturn games
Single-player video games
U.S. Gold games
Video games developed in the United Kingdom